Aamtep is a former VDC and now a neighborhood of Bhojpur Municipality in Bhojpur District in the Province No. 1 of eastern Nepal. At the time of the 1991 Nepal census it had a population of 3,136 persons living in 537  individual households.

In March 2017, the Government of Nepal restructured all the local level bodies of Nepal into 753 new local level structures.  
The previous Aamtep, Helauchha, Siddheshwar and Gupteshwar VDCs merged again in Bhojpur Municipality and rearranged the 11 wards into 12 wards.

It is Ward No. 11 of Bhojpur Municipality.

References

External links
UN map of the municipalities of Bhojpur District

Populated places in Bhojpur District, Nepal
Bhojpur Municipality